Stamping Ground is a live album by Bill Bruford's Earthworks, released on EG Records in 1994. It was the final Earthworks album to feature Django Bates, Iain Ballamy and Tim Harries. Four years later, Bruford would form a new version of Earthworks in a more traditional acoustic jazz vein.

Reception

The AllMusic review by Bill Meredith awards this album with 4.5 stars and states: "Bruford's chordal patterns sound practically symphonic amid his epic starts and stops — further proof of the originality of one of the most musical drummers of all-time. Like all great live releases, Stamping Ground makes you wish you had been there."

Writing for All About Jazz, John Kelman called the album "in some ways the most surprising record of Bruford's career to date," and noted that it "demonstrated what those fortunate enough to have caught the group in performance already knew—that despite Bruford's reputation for rigid structure in earlier projects within and outside his leadership, this was a group where every performance was, indeed, a new experience."

Track listing
 "Nerve" (Iain Ballamy) – 6:07
 "Up North" (Ballamy, Bill Bruford) – 5:20
 "A Stones Throw" (Ballamy, Django Bates, Bruford) – 8:26
 "Pilgrim's Way" (Bruford) – 8:45
 "Emotional Shirt" (Bates) – 6:01
 "It Needn't End in Tears" (Ballamy) – 8:02
 "All Heaven Broke Loose: I Psalm; II Old Song" (Ballamy, Bates, Bruford) – 7:46
 "Candles Still Flicker in Romania's Dark" (Bates) – 6:41
 "Bridge of Inhibition" (Ballamy, Bates, Bruford) – 10:58

Personnel
Bill Bruford – acoustic and electronic drums, percussion
Tim Harries – acoustic and fretless bass
Iain Ballamy – soprano, alto and tenor saxophones
Django Bates – keyboards, tenor horn, trumpet

References

Bill Bruford albums
Earthworks (band) live albums
Albums with cover art by Dave McKean
1994 live albums